Aïn Soltane is a town and commune in Souk Ahras Province in north-eastern Algeria.

Settlements
Aïn Baïda
Aïn Bakhbakha
Aïn Soltane
Aïn Tagalout
Ben Labdjaoui
Benabid
Benghodbane
Benzeblah
Boussaïd
Chkour
El Gourzi
ElKhabia dite Aïn Ferhana
Enza
Gubel Ragouba
Toumia

References

Communes of Souk Ahras Province